Achnatherum is a genus of plants which includes several species of needlegrass. Several needlegrass species have been switched between Achnatherum and genus Stipa; taxonomy between the two closely related genera is still uncertain.

Achnatherum hymenoides was useful as a food source to Native Americans. Achnatherum brachychaetum is best known as a noxious weed.

Species

Species recognized by Plants of the World Online as of November 2019:

Species previously included in Achnatherum:

 Achnatherum acutum (Swallen) Valdés-Reyna & Barkworth
 Achnatherum aridum (M.E.Jones) Barkworth - Mormon needlegrass
 Achnatherum bloomeri (Boland.) Barkworth - Bloomer's ricegrass
 Achnatherum bromoides (L.) P. Beauv.
 Achnatherum brachychaetum (Godr.) Barkworth - punagrass
 Achnatherum capense (L.) P. Beauv.
 Achnatherum caragana (Trin. & Rupr.) Nevski
 Achnatherum caudatum (Trin.) S. L. W. Jacobs & J. Everett - Chilean ricegrass
 Achnatherum clandestinum (Hack.) Barkworth - Mexican ricegrass
 Achnatherum contractum (B.L. Johnson) Barkworth - contracted ricegrass
 Achnatherum coronatum (Thurb.) Barkworth - crested needlegrass
 Achnatherum curvifolium (Swallen) Barkworth - Guadalupe ricegrass
 Achnatherum diegoense (Swallen) Barkworth - San Diego needlegrass
 Achnatherum duthiei (Hook.f.) P.C. Kuo & S.L. Lu
 Achnatherum editorum (E. Fourn.) Valdés-Reyna & Barkworth
 Achnatherum eminens (Cav.) Barkworth - southwestern needlegrass
 Achnatherum hendersonii (Vasey) Barkworth - Henderson's needlegrass
 Achnatherum hymenoides (Oryzopsis hymenoides) Ricker ex Piper - Indian ricegrass
 Achnatherum latiglume (Swallen) Barkworth - wide-glumed needlegrass
 Achnatherum lemmonii (Vasey) Barkworth - Lemmon's needlegrass
 Achnatherum lettermanii (Vasey) Barkworth - Letterman's needlegrass
 Achnatherum lobatum (Swallen) Barkworth - lobed needlegrass
 Achnatherum nelsonii (Scribn.) Barkworth - Nelson's needlegrass, Dore's needlegrass
 Achnatherum nevadense (B.L. Johnson) Barkworth - Nevada needlegrass
 Achnatherum occidentale (Thurb.) Barkworth - western needlegrass
 Achnatherum parishii (Vasey) Barkworth - Parish's needlegrass
 Achnatherum perplexum Hoge & Barkworth - perplexing needlegrass
 Achnatherum pinetorum (M.E. Jones) Barkworth - pinewoods needlegrass
 Achnatherum richardsonii (Link) Barkworth - Richardson's needlegrass
 Achnatherum robustum (Vasey) Barkworth - sleepygrass
 Achnatherum roshevitzii Mussajev - Roshevich's achnatherum
 Achnatherum scribneri (Vasey) Barkworth - Scribner needlegrass
 Achnatherum speciosum Trin. & Rupr. - desert needlegrass
 Achnatherum splendens (Trin.) Nevski
 Achnatherum stillmanii (Bol.) Barkworth - Stillman's needlegrass
 Achnatherum thurberianum (Piper) Barkworth - Thurber's needlegrass
 Achnatherum swallenii (C.L. Hitchc. & Spellenb.) Barkworth - Swallen's needlegrass
 Achnatherum webberi (Thurb.) Barkworth - Webber needlegrass

References

 CRC World Dictionary of Grasses - Common Names, Scientific Names, Eponyms, Synonyms, and Etymology - Volume I (A - D), by Umberto Quattrocchi,

External links
USDA Plants Profile for Achnatherum species
Herbarium.usu.edu: Achnatherum Genus key

 
Grasses of North America
Grasses of the United States
Grasses of Mexico
Native grasses of California
Poaceae genera
Taxa named by Palisot de Beauvois